Hiroshiba-ike Dam is an earthen dam located in Nara prefecture in Japan. The dam is used for agriculture. The catchment area of the dam is  km2. The dam impounds about 1  ha of land when full and can store 16 thousand cubic meters of water. The construction of the dam was completed in 1939.

References

Dams in Nara Prefecture
1939 establishments in Japan